Hydrangea longifolia is a species of flowering plant in the family Hydrangeaceae endemic to Taiwan. It is an erect shrub that flowers in January. It occurs in forests at low to high elevations. It is closely related to Hydrangea involucrata from Japan.

References

longifolia
Endemic flora of Taiwan